Fawcett Properties Ltd v Buckingham County Council [1960] has become a leading case in planning law and concerned agricultural conditions of use. It is also relevant for its tests on finding certainty versus uncertainty of policy, contract or other concepts rendering them void. It has been applied in English trusts law which has long held a cy-près doctrine, expressed in pre 1649-Law French meaning "there nearly" that is perfecting concepts or a purpose for funds which is tantamount to a legitimate interest or concern and intended to take clear effect.

Legal context
The law of planning permissions, integral to urban planning, sits at the crossroads of land law and public law. Specifically it combines the laws enabling and interpreting development and commercial interests with public interest laws such as in social welfare, food resource sustainability, quality/aesthetic consistency of housing and pollution mitigation.  The case stressed the legitimate goal of protection of the Metropolitan Green Belt in primary legislation and similar restrictions crop up in rural zoned land use areas outside of Local Plan development zones, in UK planning practical policy.  The case upheld the ability of local planning authorities (LPAs) to impose restrictions which will only allow development in sensitive parts of their areas where meeting a pressing agricultural need to house the family of an agricultural/forestry worker, provided it has balanced such policies against those enabling developments to, if fully developed, meet the local housing needs assessment.  The cases recognises that greenfield sites are cheaper to develop and have more aesthetic qualities than many brownfield (urban) sites however many LPAs will choose to make any development on such land a narrow exception not a norm.

Facts
Buckingham County Council gave permission for cottages to be built in an urban green belt, on the condition that ‘occupation of the houses shall be limited to persons whose employment.... is... in agriculture... or in forestry or in an industry mainly dependent upon agriculture’, as defined by the Town and Country Planning Act 1947 section 119. Fawcett Properties Ltd argued this condition was void.

Judgment
The House of Lords held that the condition was valid because it followed the policy of keeping the green belt for agricultural population, similarly defined in the Housing Act 1936 section 115. The definition could not, without overwhelming evidence, be held void for uncertainty.

In the course of his judgment, Lord Denning reasoned:

Applied in
Trump International Golf Club Scotland Ltd v The Scottish Ministers [2015] UKSC 74, Supreme Court (Scotland) (SC S)
Percy v Hall [1997] QB 924, CA
Newbury District Council v Secretary of State for the Environment (1977) 75 LGR 608, DC (Divisional Court)
City of London Corporation v Secretary of State for the Environment (1971) 71 LGR 28
East Suffolk County Council v Secretary of State for the Environment (1972) 70 LGR 595, DC
Hall & Co Ltd v Shoreham-by-Sea Urban District Council [1964] 1 WLR 240 and (1963) 61 LGR 508, CA including Obiter dictum/Opinion of Lord Denning

Considered in
Newbury District Council v Secretary of State for the Environment [1978] 1 WLR 1241, CA
Kingsway Investments (Kent) Ltd v Kent County Council [1969] 2 QB 332, CA
Mixnams Properties Ltd v Chertsey Urban District Council [1964] 1 QB 214, CA
Wilson v West Sussex County Council [1963] 2 QB 764, CA

See also

English trust law
Pyx Granite Co Ltd v Ministry of Housing and Local Government [1960] AC 260, per Lord Denning
In re Roberts, Sir George Jessel MR

Notes and references

English trusts case law
English land case law
1961 in case law
1961 in British law
House of Lords cases
Lord Denning cases